St Martins Tower is a  office building in Perth, Western Australia. It was the tallest building in the city from its completion in 1978 for almost 10 years, until it was overtaken in height by the BankWest Tower in 1988. The tower contains a revolving restaurant  on level 33, the last floor with windows called "C Restaurant" and is the only revolving restaurant in Western Australia. For years it was informally known as the AAPT Tower, and later  The Amcom Building.

External links
St Martins Tower on Emporis.com (General database of skyscrapers)

Skyscrapers in Perth, Western Australia
Buildings and structures with revolving restaurants
Office buildings in Perth, Western Australia
Skyscraper office buildings in Australia